The Irving Nature Park is a free park in Saint John, New Brunswick, Canada, close to the nearby urban centre, only minutes away from the uptown area. This environmental retreat was developed with the intention of protecting the environment. The park is owned and operated by JD Irving and is open annually from May through October for motor-vehicle traffic.

References

External links
 JD Irving Limited
 Irving Forest Discovery Network

Parks in Saint John, New Brunswick